To Be or Not to Be, formerly titled Hakka Women (and released overseas under that name) is a 2014 television series produced by Hong Kong Television Network. The first episode premiered on December 12, 2014.

Cast
 Maggie Cheung Ho-yee as Anson, Leung Mei-hang
Hill's ex-girlfriend, Cheung Tai-loi's girlfriend
 Prudence Liew as Leung Mei-tin
Cheung Kwok-cheung's wife, Tam Jeun-fai's girlfriend
 Poon Chan-leung as Hill, Au-yeung Shan
Anson's ex-boyfriend, Isabella's boyfriend
 Zac Kao as Cheung Tai-loi
 Savio Tsang as Cheung Kwok-cheung
 Queena Chan as Isabella, Zhang Dan-feng
 Lam Lei as Tam Jeun-fai
 May Tse as Ma Yau-kam
 Oscar Chan as Jacky Pang
 Janice Ting as Lana Hui
 Emily Wong as Lennon Ching
 Mimi Kung as Siu Suk-wai
 Wilson Tsui as Leung Chun-kong
 Fung So-bor as Cheung Kwok-cheung's mother
 Cheng Shu-fung as Cheung Kwok-cheung's father
 Ng Wai-shan as Siu Lai
 Amy Tsang as Susan Chan
 Nadia Lun as Pancy
 Carlos Koo as Roy
 Jan Tse as Cindy
 Danel Yu as Fiona
 Simon Lo as Kin
 Leung Kin-ping as Ken
 Vivi Lee as Lam Siu-bing
 Dexter Young as Anson's lawyer, episode 22 to 25
 Candy Chu as kitchen staff, episode 25

External links
 Official website

Hong Kong Television Network original programming
2014 Hong Kong television series debuts
2010s Hong Kong television series
Hakka culture in Hong Kong